Darnell Town is an unincorporated community in Lee County, Virginia, in the United States. It is part of the Keokee census-designated place.

History
Darnell Town was named for Raleigh Darnell, who kept a store.

References

Unincorporated communities in Lee County, Virginia
Unincorporated communities in Virginia